The 2022–23 season is the 145th season in the existence of Wrexham A.F.C. and their 13th consecutive season in the National League. Wrexham are one of the five Welsh football clubs in the English football league system. In addition to the National League, Wrexham are also participating in this season's editions of the FA Trophy and the FA Cup. The season is unusual in that the fixture dates of domestic and European competitions were consistently postponed to accommodate the coverage of the 2022 FIFA World Cup played in November and December 2022 in Qatar.

Wrexham kicked off the season by beating Eastleigh 2–1 in the National League, and were knocked out of the FA Trophy by Altrincham on penalties at the Fourth round proper in January 2023. As of the end of 2022, Wrexham sat second in the National League, four points behind Notts County with a game in hand, and were eventually knocked out of the FA Cup in the Fourth round proper by Sheffield United conceding two late goals.

Kits
Supplier: Macron / Shirt front sponsor: TikTok / Shirt back sponsor: Expedia / Sleeve sponsor: Vistaprint / Shorts sponsor: Ifor Williams Trailers

First team squad

Transfers

In

Out

Loans out

Released

New contracts

Pre-season and friendlies
On 22 June 2022, Wrexham announced plans for their pre-season campaign.

Competitions

Overall record

National League

League table

Results summary

Results by round

Matches

On 6 July 2022, the National League fixtures were revealed.

FA Cup

On 3 October 2022, the Fourth qualifying round was drawn. On 17 October 2022, the First Round Proper was drawn. On 7 November 2022, the Second Round Proper was drawn. On 28 November 2022, the Third Round Proper was drawn. On 8 January 2023, the Fourth Round Proper was drawn.

FA Trophy

On 22 November 2022, the Third Round Proper was drawn. On 19 December 2022, the Fourth Round Proper was drawn.

Squad statistics

Appearances and goals

|-
|colspan="14"|Players away on loan:
|-
|colspan="14"|Players who appeared for Wrexham but left during the season:
|}

Goal scorers

Clean sheets

Hat-tricks

Disciplinary record

Home attendance 

 Sold season tickets: 6,820

References

Wrexham A.F.C. seasons
Welsh football clubs 2022–23 season